Undercover Boss Canada is a Canadian reality television series, based on the British series of the same name. Each episode depicts a person who has a high management position at a major Canadian business, deciding to become undercover as an entry-level employee to discover the faults in the company. The first season consisted of 10 episodes, and ran from February 2, 2012 to April 5, 2012, on W Network. On April 3, 2012, W Network, Alliance, and Corus ordered an additional 30 episodes for the series, to be split into four new seasons. The second season also consisted of 10 episodes, and aired from September 6, 2012 to November 8, 2012. The show's third season contained 10 episodes, and aired from January 17, 2013 to March 21, 2013.

Format 
CEOs from ten of Canada's biggest corporations stealthily join the ranks of their own unsuspecting workforce in the anticipated new series Undercover Boss Canada. Each episode features a prominent executive from a Canadian company who goes incognito among their employees. The executive, in disguise, works with their staff who believe they are simply training a new recruit. Each “boss” takes an often emotional journey, discovering the effects their decisions have on others, the perception of the company, and who the unsung heroes of their workforce are. Most importantly, they learn how to apply what they have gained from the experience – both for their company and for themselves.

Episodes

Summary

Episodes
 No. = Overall episode number
 Ep = Episode number by season

Season 1: 2012

Season 2: 2012
On April 3, 2012, the W Network ordered an additional 30 episodes. The second season, which contained 10 episodes, aired from September 6, 2012 to November 8, 2012.

Season 3: 2013
The show's third season, which contains 10 episodes, aired from January 17, 2013 to March 21, 2013.

Season 4: 2013
The show's fourth season, which contains 10 episodes, aired from September 19, 2013 to November 21, 2013.

References

2012 Canadian television series debuts
2013 Canadian television series endings
2010s Canadian reality television series
Television series by Entertainment One
Television series by Corus Entertainment
Canadian television series based on British television series
W Network original programming
Undercover Boss